Oldflån-Ansätten Nature Reserve is a nature reserve in Jämtland County in Sweden.

The nature reserve includes the mountain peak Ansätten as well as areas of wetland. The wetland area is diverse in its composition and provides a habitat for several species of birds; it is part of the EU-wide Natura 2000-network and is a designated Ramsar site. The flora of the area is also rich and includes several species of orchids, cloudberry and Pedicularis oederi; the nature reserve is one of only a few known locales for the latter.

The nature reserve is grazed by reindeer belonging to the local Sami population.

References

Nature reserves in Sweden
Natura 2000 in Sweden
Tourist attractions in Jämtland County
Geography of Jämtland County
Protected areas established in 2002
2002 establishments in Sweden